Shooting at the 1908 Summer Olympics in London saw fifteen shooting events.  Most of the events were held at Bisley, Surrey while the trap shooting events were held at Uxendon.

Medal summary

Participating nations
A total of 215 shooters from 14 nations competed at the London Games:

Medal table

Notes

References
 
 

 
1908 Summer Olympics events
1908
Olympics
Shooting competitions in the United Kingdom